Ariane Mitsuye Koizumi is an American fashion model and actress, sometimes credited as Ariane, who played the controversial lead role in the film Year of the Dragon.

Biography 
Koizumi was born in Riverdale, Bronx, a neighborhood in New York City. Her mother was a Dutch nurse and her father was a Japanese graphic artist. She started modeling at the age of fifteen, and in 1983 she dropped out of Parsons School of Design to pursue modeling full-time. By 1984 The New York Times, covering the Milan fashion shows, called Koizumi the "one model that none can keep their eyes off". The next year she appeared in Vogue, Harper's Bazaar, and Self, and the Sun-Sentinel noted that she had become "Giorgio Armani's favorite model".

Koizumi made her acting debut in the 1985 Michael Cimino film Year of the Dragon as Tracy Tzu, a Chinese American television reporter who falls in love with the fanatical cop Stanley White, played by Mickey Rourke. The Los Angeles Times summarized the character as "there to fulfill all Oriental-woman fantasies", and The New York Times called Koizumi "so ineffectual a part of the film's framework that she is even upstaged, in a nude scene, by a glimpse of the Brooklyn Bridge". Her performance in the film was so widely panned that it "nipped her budding film career", but she subsequently had a cameo in Abel Ferrara's King of New York and continued her modeling career with print work in Self, French Vogue, and the September 1989 cover of Mirabella, along with television commercials for Michelob, L'Eggs, and Levi's, and runway modeling for Karl Lagerfeld and Donna Karan.

Koizumi left modeling in 1989 to work as an intern for a record label, with the goal of pursuing a career in music. She later worked for the New York Prada store, and raised three children.

Filmography 

Year of the Dragon (1985) – Tracy Tzu
King of New York (1990) – Ariane

References

External links 
 

Living people
American actresses of Japanese descent
Female models from New York (state)
American models of Japanese descent
American people of Dutch descent
Year of birth missing (living people)
21st-century American women